Dejan Djokić is a historian from Serbia. He is Professor at Goldsmiths, University of London and Visiting Professor at Humboldt University of Berlin.

Biography 
Đokić graduated in history from SSEES, University of London in 1996 and received his doctorate from University College London in 2004. He is professor of Modern and Contemporary History and Director of the Center for Balkan Studies at Goldsmiths College, University of London. He is a research associate at the Royal Historical Society, and was a research associate at the Woodrow Wilson Center in Washington and the Harriman Institute in New York. He is the author of, among other things, the book "Elusive Compromise: A History of Interwar Yugoslavia" (2007) and the editor of "Yugoslavism: Histories of a Failed Idea, 1918-1992" (2003). Dejan Djokic is lecturer in the Department of History at Goldsmiths College, University of London. His research interests lie in the field of modern history of the Balkans, in particular the political, social and cultural history of the former Yugoslavia.

References

Living people
21st-century Serbian historians
Historians of the Balkans
Members of the Serbian Academy of Sciences and Arts
Year of birth missing (living people)
Yugoslav People's Army personnel
Academics of Goldsmiths, University of London